Andrei Vyacheslavovich Bagayev (born 7 June 1978) is a former Russian professional football player.

Club career
He played in the Russian Football National League for FC Irtysh Omsk in 2010.

Personal life
He is the older brother of Anton Bagayev.

References

External links
 

1978 births
Living people
Russian footballers
Association football midfielders
FC Sibir Novosibirsk players
FC Irtysh Omsk players